Peter Chang (1944–2017) was a British artist known for his distinctive jewelry. He trained as a graphic designer and sculptor at the Liverpool College of Art. He won the Liverpool Senior City Scholarship in 1966 which enabled him to study in Paris at Atelier 17 under S.W. Hayter. From the 1980s onward, he focused on jewelry-making. His collection was featured in Rifat Ozbek’s 1987 fashion show. His work is in collections around the world, including the Victoria and Albert Museum, the Metropolitan Museum of Art, Schmuckmuseum Pforzheim, German Goldsmith's House and the Cooper Hewitt.

Recognition 
 1989: Scottish Gold Award
 1995: Jerwood Prize for the Applied Arts

References

External links 
 Peter Chang's Bracelet, 1995 at the Metropolitan Museum of Art
 Color, Fun and Fantasy: The Telling Marks of Jewelry by Peter Chang

1944 births
2017 deaths
Artists from Liverpool
British jewellery designers